The Morning Call is a daily newspaper in Allentown, Pennsylvania. Founded in 1883, it is the second longest continuously published newspaper in the Lehigh Valley, after The Express-Times. In 2020, the newspaper permanently closed its Allentown headquarters after allegedly failing to pay four months of rent and citing diminishing advertising revenues.

The newspaper is owned by Alden Global Capital, a New York Citybased hedge fund.

History

19th century
The Morning Call was founded in 1883. Its original name was The Critic. Its original editor, owner and chief reporter was Samuel S. Woolever. The newspaper's first reporter was a Muhlenberg College senior, David A. Miller. The newspaper was subsequently acquired and owned by Charles Weiser, its editor, and Kirt W. DeBelle, its business manager.

In 1894, the newspaper launched a reader contest, offering $5 in gold to a school boy or girl in Lehigh County who could guess the publication's new name. The identity of the lucky winner is lost to history. But on January 1, 1895, Allentown City Treasurer A.L. Reichenbach, who supervised the contest, announced that the newspaper was being renamed The Morning Call. That same year, David A. Miller and his brother Samuel Miller began purchasing private shares in The Morning Call, ultimately acquiring the newspaper completely in 1904.

20th century
By 1920, the newspaper's circulation was 20,000. That year, Harry Clay Trexler acquired the newspaper from the Miller brothers. A year following Trexler's death in 1933, David A. Miller returned to the newspaper. In 1935, The Morning Call acquired a competing Allentown newspaper, The Chronicle and News, renaming it The Evening Chronicle. In 1938, The Sunday Call-Chronicle was first published.

In 1951, David A. Miller assumed the official title of president of the Call-Chronicle newspapers, maintaining that role until his death in 1958 at age 88. In September 1951, Miller's two sons, Donald and Samuel, were appointed the newspaper's publishers. After Samuel Miller's death in 1967, Donald P. Miller continued to run the newspaper along with huis son Edward D. Miller, who was appointed executive editor and publisher in the late 1970s.

In 1980, The Evening Chronicle ceased publication. The following year, in 1981, Edward D. Miller left the newspaper, and Donald P. Miller returned as its chairman. Bernard C. Stinner was appointed the newspaper's publisher and chief executive officer. In 1984, the newspaper was sold to the Times Mirror Company. Gary K. Shorts was appointed the newspaper's publisher and chief executive officer in 1987. He was succeeded by Guy Gilmore in 2000. Susan Hunt was named publisher in June 2001.

21st century
In 2000, Times Mirror Company's media assets, including The Morning Call, were acquired by Tribune Media. 

In May 2021, The Morning Call was again acquired, this time by Alden Global Capital, a New York Citybased hedge fund, which already had acquired nearly a third of Tribune Media. The acquisition was opposed and then criticized by the guild representing journalists at the newspaper.

Controversies

Rape and sexual assault allegations against columnist
In 2020, Paul Carpenter, a Morning Call bureau chief and Morning Call columnist for 25 years from 1984 until 2019 was sued by his daughter, who charged Carpenter with "repeatedly raping and sexually assaulting" her for a decade from age nine until age nineteen.

Rent arrears and headquarters closure
In 2020, the landlord for The Morning Calls offices at 101 N. Sixth Street in Center City Allentown sued The Morning Call, alleging it had failed to pay rent for the headquarters for four consecutive months in April, May, June, and again in July 2020. 

On August 12, 2020, the newspaper's interim general manager Timothy Thomas sent an email to employees, announcing that The Morning Call was permanently closing its headquarters, which the newspaper had maintained for a century since 1920, as it searched "for ways to save money as advertising revenue dwindled." The newspaper's roughly 100 employees were asked in the email to "retrieve personal items from the office by September 15," the newspaper reported.

See also
Media in the Lehigh Valley

References

External links
 

1883 establishments in Pennsylvania
Daily newspapers published in Pennsylvania
Mass media in Allentown, Pennsylvania
Publications established in 1883